Þórir Ólafsson (born 28 November 1979) is a retired Icelandic handball player.

References

External links
 Profile at Vive Targi Kielce official website
 

1979 births
Living people
Thorir Olafsson
Vive Kielce players
People from Selfoss